Pak Ki-so (1929 – January 2010) was a North Korean politician and marshal. He served as the commander of Pyongyang Defense Command

Biography
In November 1970 he was appointed an alternate member of the 5th Central Committee and elected to full member of the 6th Central Committee in October 1980, following the 6th Congress of the Workers' Party of Korea. In 1982 he was elected to the 7th convocation of the Supreme People's Assembly. In February 1986 he was appointed to a full member of the Central Committee. In November that year he was appointed commander of the 820th Tank Division and was also elected to the 8th convocation. In 1990 he was elected to the 9th convocation In 1990 he was elected to the 9th convocation of the Supreme People's Assembly. In March 1995 he was appointed a member of the 6th Central Military Commission. On 13 April 1997 he was promoted to Vice Marshal rank. Between October 1996 and 2005 he served as the commander of Pyongyang Defense Command. In January 2010 he died. He was member of the funeral committee of Choe Hyon and Pak Song-chol.

In April 1982 he was awarded Order of Kim Il-sung.

References

1929 births
2010 deaths
North Korean generals
Workers' Party of Korea politicians
Members of the Supreme People's Assembly